British Naval Forces Germany was a command (military formation) of the Royal Navy that was active from 1944 to 1961 under three titles.

It was administered originally by the British Naval Commander-in-Chief, Germany from 1944 to 1946. In 1946 the commander's title changed to Vice-Admiral Commanding, British Naval Forces, Germany from 1946 to 1947, before being renamed to Flag Officer, British Naval Forces Germany until 1961.

History
In 1944, the Allied Naval Commander-in-Chief, Expeditionary Force, was also given the title of British Naval Commander-in-Chief, Germany. In addition, he became also Head of the Naval Division of the Control Commission for Germany, not always in attendance in Berlin, he was represented by a Deputy Head who attended the BERGOS (Chiefs of Staff) meetings.

His headquarters were initially at Hamburg and then transferred later at Minden. His title was altered in 1946 to Vice Admiral Commanding, British Naval Forces, Germany. In 1947 the post holders title was changed to Flag Officer Commanding, British Naval Forces, Germany. Apart from his additional role as Chief British Naval Representative in the Allied Control Commission (Germany), he was responsible for all naval matters in Western Germany, Denmark, Holland and Norway.

As British Naval Commander-in-Chief, Germany, he was supported by a number of flag officers some of whose titles changed, due to an expanding of their particular command areas and duties. Rear-Admiral Harold Tom Baillie-Grohman began his appointment in 1944 as Flag Officer-in-Charge, Kiel but then became Flag Officer, Schleswig-Holstein. Baillie-Grohman's main task was eliminating remnants of the Kriegsmarine. Flag Officer, Wilhelmshaven became Flag Officer, Western Germany.

In May 1951 the admiral's title was changed again to Flag Officer, Germany. In 1955 the Secretary of State for Defence described the admiral's duties as "The Flag Officer, Germany, in his North Atlantic Treaty Organisation capacity as the Commander, Allied Naval Forces, Northern Area, Central Europe, is responsible to the Supreme Allied
Commander, Europe, for naval planning matters in the British Zone and for the operational control of the Royal Naval forces in Germany. He is the naval member of the Commanders-in-Chief Committee (Germany) which is responsible to the Chiefs of Staff Committee in this country. The entry into force of the Paris Treaties will not affect the foregoing duties of the post until at least the future German navy is capable of performing the tasks required of naval forces in Germany."
 
In 1961 the post was disestablished.

The command had its headquarters in four successive locations:

Flag Officers

British Naval Commander-in-Chief, Germany
Post holders included:

Flag Officer, Holland

Flag Officer-in-Charge, Kiel

Flag Officer, Norway

Flag Officer, Schleswig-Holstein

Flag Officer, Western Germany

Flag Officer, Wilhelmshaven

Commodore-in-Charge, Hamburg

Vice-Admiral Commanding, British Naval Forces, Germany

Flag Officer Commanding, British Naval Forces, Germany

Flag Officer, Germany

Units and shore establishments
Shore establishments and units in Germany at various times from 1945 included:

References

Further reading 
 Chris Madsen, The Royal Navy and German Naval Disarmament, 1942–1947

Commands of the Royal Navy
Military units and formations established in 1944
Military units and formations disestablished in 1961